HCG may refer to:

 Hickson Compact Group
 Hellenic Coast Guard
 Honoris Crux Gold, of the Republic of South Africa
 Human chorionic gonadotropin (hCG)
 HCG pregnancy strip test